István Nagy may refer to:

István Nagy (painter) (1873-1937), Hungarian painter
István Nagy (writer) (1904–1977), Hungarian writer
István Nagy (floristics) (1905–1974), Hungarian botanist
István Nagy (sculptor) (born 1920), Hungarian sculptor
István Nagy (footballer, born 1939) (1939–1999), Hungarian footballer
István Nagy (politician, born 1954) (born 1954), Hungarian politician
István Nagy (athlete) (born 1959), Hungarian sprinter
István Nagy (politician, born 1967) (born 1967), Hungarian agrarian engineer and politician
István Nagy (ice hockey) (born 1981), Hungarian-ethnic Romanian ice hockey player
István Nagy (footballer, born 1986), Hungarian footballer